Natividad Almeda-López (8 September 1892 – 22 January 1977) was the first female lawyer in the Philippines, passing the bar in 1914 and the first woman to defend a woman in a court of law. She was also the first female judge of the municipal court of Manila.

She has been described as a "beacon in the feminist movement"

Personal life
She married Domingo López, a lawyer, when she was 30 and they had three children, Marita, Lulu and Jake.
During WW2 she and her three children were evacuated from Manila to her husbands home city of Tayabas

Career
Almeda-López passed the bar in 1913 but due to her being too young she had to wait one year before joining the Roll of Attorneys.
Aged 26 she delivered a speech at the Philippine Legislative Assembly arguing for women's rights. In 1919 she had been hired by the Bureau of Justice and was promoted to assistant attorney at the Attorney General’s Office. In 1934 president Manuel Quezon gave her a permanent appointment as city judge of the City of Court of Manila, a post she had served in as a temporary capacity for three years.

Honours
Since her death the government of the Philippines has honoured her legacy in various ways. In 1996 naming a street after her, She was given three presidential awards, the Presidential Medal of Merit for her leadership in the feminist movement in 1955, in 1966 she was given recognition for her work in women's rights and in 1968 she again received the Presidential Medal of Merit

See also 
 First women lawyers around the world

References 

1892 births
1977 deaths
People from Manila
Filipino feminists
Filipino women judges
20th-century Filipino lawyers
20th-century women judges